Sathyanarayana Raju most often refers to Indian spiritual guru Sathya Sai Baba.

Sathyanarayana Raju or Satyanarayana Raju may also refer to:
 Alluri Satyanarayana Raju, Indian freedom fighter and politician
 Alluri Venkata Sathyanarayana Raju (born 1937), Indian industrialist and chairman of Nagarjuna Construction Company Ltd.
 Datla Satyanarayana Raju (1904–1973), Indian physician and parliamentarian
 K. Satyanarayana Raju, Indian politician
 Penmetsa Satyanarayana Raju (1908–1966), former Chief Justice of Andhra Pradesh High Court